Student television may refer to:
 A student television station, one run by students
 The National Student Television Association (NaSTA)
 University of North Carolina at Chapel Hill Student Television